A seal, in an East and Southeast Asian context, is a general name for printing stamps and impressions thereof which are used in lieu of signatures in personal documents, office paperwork, contracts, art, or any item requiring acknowledgement or authorship. On documents they were usually used to print an impression using a pigmented paste or ink, unlike the wax impression commonly used in Europe. Of Chinese origin, the process soon spread beyond China and across East and Southeast Asia. Various countries in these regions currently use a mixture of seals and hand signatures, and, increasingly, electronic signatures.

Chinese seals are typically made of stone, sometimes of metals, wood, bamboo, plastic, or ivory, and are typically used with red ink or cinnabar paste. The word 印 ("yìn" in Mandarin, "in" in Japanese and Korean, "ấn" and "in" in Vietnamese) specifically refers to the imprint created by the seal, as well as appearing in combination with other morphemes in words related to any printing, as in the word "印刷", "printing", pronounced "yìnshuā" in Mandarin, "insatsu" in Japanese. In the western world, Asian seals were traditionally known by traders as chop marks or simply chops, a term adapted from the Hindi chapa and the Malay cap, meaning stamp or rubber stamps.

The Japanese emperors, shōguns, and samurai had their personal seals pressed onto edicts and other public documents to show authenticity and authority. Even today, Japanese citizens' companies regularly use name seals for the signing of a contract and other important paperwork.

History

Origin legends and early history 

Throughout Chinese history, seals have played an important part and are known to have been used both by government authorities and private individuals for thousands of years. The earliest known examples of seals in ancient China date to the Shang dynasty (c. 1600–1046 BC) and were discovered at archaeological sites at Anyang. However, how these ancient seals were used remains to be uncovered as it is only starting from the Spring and Autumn period (771–476 BC) of the Zhou dynasty (1046–256 BC) that there is an increase in the quantity of Chinese seals paired together with textual references to them. Until the end of the Warring States period (476 BC–221 BC), all seals were only known as xǐ, regardless if they were used by government officials or in private use and regardless of any material used to make them.
 
During the Han dynasty (202–220 AD), an origin myth of the supposed first seal in Chinese history was recorded, this myth states that the first seal was given to the Yellow Emperor by a yellow dragon which had a chart on its back. According to another origin myth, the first seal was given to Emperor Yao by a fenghuang (a mythical bird) as he was sitting in a boat. In both of these origin legends, the gifting of the seal is a symbol that the Mandate of Heaven was conferred to its recipient. So when Tang, the first ruler of the Shang dynasty, overthrows the last tyrannical ruler of the (possibly mythical) Xia dynasty (presumed c. 2070–1600 BC), he seizes the royal seal from him to symbolically establish his power.

Imperial China 

During China's Imperial Period, the term xǐ would gradually begin to become a designation exclusively reserved for the seals of the Emperors. During the Han dynasty, the Emperor of China only had 6 imperial seals, later during the Tang dynasty (618–907) this number had grown to 8, during the Ming dynasty (1368–1644) this number would further grow to there now being over a dozen imperial seals, and by the reign of the Qing dynasty (1636–1912, 1917), there were several dozen official imperial seals that were used by its Emperors. The inscriptions on these official imperial seals usually refer to either the Emperor receiving the Mandate of Heaven or to the Emperor being "the successor of Heaven".
 
According to The New Book of Tang (Tangshu), Empress Wu Zetian issued a decree that changed the usage of the word xǐ, which was up until then used for imperial seals, to bǎo (treasure). Her reasoning behind this change was that she thought that the word xǐ sounded too much like death (si, 死) or rest (xi, 息). But when Emperor Zhongzong was resumed to the throne of the Tang dynasty in the year 705, he changed the name for imperial seals back to xǐ. In subsequent centuries both the terms xǐ and bǎo were alternated, depending on the period.

Another type of seal that was used by the Chinese Emperors was a seal to indicate that a certain text or official document was written in the Emperor’s own handwriting as opposed to written by someone ordered to do so by the Emperor. In the case of the Qing dynasty period Qianlong Emperor, who was known for his literary ambitions, including his ability to write in well-renowned calligraphy, had produced a large amount of texts which were affixed with the seal to indicate that they were his own writing. When the calligraphy of the Qianlong Emperor was carved into stone steles, the print of the seal was also copied onto the stone surface.

Engraving types 

 Zhuwen seals imprint the Chinese characters in red ink, sometimes referred to as yang seals. 
 Baiwen seals imprint the background in red, leaving white characters, sometimes referred to as yin seals.
 Zhubaiwen Xiangjianyin seals use zhuwen and baiwen together

Government authorities

National government 

The Chinese emperors, their families and officials used large seals known as xǐ, later renamed bǎo (treasure'), which corresponds to the Great Seals of Western countries. These were usually made of jade (although hard wood or precious metal could also be used), and were originally square in shape. They were changed to a rectangular form during the Song dynasty, but reverted to square during the Qing dynasty.

The most important of these seals was the Heirloom Seal of the Realm, which was created by the first Emperor of China, Qin Shi Huang, and was seen as a legitimising device embodying or symbolising the Mandate of Heaven. The Heirloom Seal was passed down through several dynasties, but had been lost by the beginning of the Ming dynasty. This partly explains the Qing emperors' obsession with creating numerous imperial seals - for the emperors' official use alone the Forbidden City in Beijing has a collection of 25 seals - in order to reduce the significance of the Heirloom Seal.

These seals typically bore the titles of the offices, rather than the names of the owners. Different seals could be used for different purposes: for example, the Qianlong Emperor had a number of informal appreciation seals used on select paintings in his collection.

The most popular style of script for government seals in the imperial eras of China (from the Song dynasty to Qing dynasty) is the Nine-fold Script, a highly stylised script which is unreadable to the untrained.

In its 143 years of existence, the government of the Nguyễn dynasty had created more than 100 imperial seals. According to Dr. Phan Thanh Hải, Director of the Huế Monuments Conservation Centre, at the end of the Nguyễn dynasty period the Purple Forbidden City in Huế contained a total of 93 jade and gold seals of which 2 seals were from the Nguyễn lords period.

The government of the Republic of China in Taiwan has continued to use traditional square seals of up to about 13 centimetres, known by a variety of names depending on the user's hierarchy. Part of the inaugural ceremony for the President of the Republic of China includes bestowing on them the Seal of the Republic of China and the Seal of Honor.

In China, the Seal of the People's Government of the People's Republic of China was a square bronze seal with side length of 9 centimetres. Its inscription reads "Seal of the Central People's Government of the People's Republic of China". Notably, the seal uses the relatively modern Song typeface rather than the more ancient seal scripts, and the seal is called a yìn, not a xǐ. Government seals in the People's Republic of China today are usually circular in shape, and have a five-pointed star in the centre of the circle. The name of the governmental institution is arranged around the star in a semicircle – a form also adopted by some company chops.

 Government officials 
Government bureaucrats would receive office seals that served as a status token of both their office and authority. These government office seals tended to be small enough in size that they could be carried by the official on their belts. Unlike imperial seals and other seals of high office which were known as xi (璽); lower seals of rank and appointment were known as yin (印).

Throughout history different regulations existed for these office seals that would prescribe what materials should be used (copper-alloys or gold) and how their seal knobs should be shaped (some with a handle in the shape of a turtle, some of a camel). Until the Eastern Han dynasty period government regulations stipulated that the ink used to affix official seals had their colours determined based in the rank of the official in question, with various colours such as green, purple, yellow, Etc.

Throughout Chinese history the calligraphy used for government office seals changed in radical ways. By the Han dynasty period the inscriptions of office seals tended to become thicker and more angular. From the Sui dynasty period the calligraphy had become more rounded and thinner than before, and later during the Song and Yuan dynasties periods the jiudie (nine-folded) script was the preferred type of calligraphy. During the Qing dynasty period, most government office seals were bilingual with the Chinese (Seal script) inscription on the right side of the seal and the Manchu script inscription on its left.

 Personal 
There are many classes of personal seals. Private seals are naturally unregulated; therefore they show the largest variety in content, shape, size, material, and calligraphy of any type of seal. Seals with names, pen names, pseudonyms, etc on them were used as an early type of signature by people in their private lives. Artists would also sign their works and letters with their seals. Furthermore, Chinese literati are known to usually use a number of different pen names in their works, so trying to identify a person's name from a specific seal can be a tricky business.

 Name (名印) 
Denotes the person's name.

 Free (閑印) 
Can contain the person's personal philosophy or literary inclination. These can be any shape, ranging from ovals to dragon-shaped.

 Studio (齋印) 

Carry the name of the person's private studio, which most literati in ancient China had, although probably in lesser forms. These are usually rectangular in shape.

 Art collectors' seals 
 
In Imperial China it was considered to be customary for collectors and connoisseurs of art to affix the print of their seals on the surface of a scroll of painting or calligraphy. Artists themselves often used their own seals on artworks, such as on works of Chinese calligraphy or Chinese paintings. Collector seals were chiefly used for the function of authenticating different pieces of art. Thus a collector seal identified to be of a famous art collector or connoisseur would become an integral part of an artwork itself and could substantially raise its monetary value on the Chinese art market. Thus in the course of several centuries, some Chinese paintings have become covered by a number of different seals of their different owners during the course of their existence. 
 
The Emperors of China also had their own imperial seals to appraise and appreciate art. As such, many famous paintings from the Forbidden City in Beijing tend to have the imperial seals for art appraisal and appreciation of generations of subsequent emperors on them.

 Leisure seals 

Many types of private seal not categorised above are usually categorised under the umbrella term "leisure seals". The inscription on leisure seals is usually a short text which is either a quote from a famous writing or just some saying that the owner of the seal thought is important. Typical inscriptions on leisure seals include "Respect fate", "Attain wisdom", "Respect", "Use loyalty and humanity in your affairs", among many others. Chinese leisure seals are comparable to Signature blocks with a quote at the end of an e-mail or internet messages where the author append some sort of proverb or saying that they consider valuable at the end.

 Seal paste 

There are two types of seal paste (to make the impression) depending on what base material they are made of. The standard colour is vermilion red (or lighter or darker shades of red) but other colours can be used such as black, navy, etc. for specific purposes.

 Silk: The red paste is made from finely pulverized cinnabar, mixed with castor oil and silk strands. The silk strands bind the mixture together to form a very thick substance. It has a very oily appearance and tends to be a bright red in colour.
 Plant: The red paste is made from finely pulverized cinnabar, mixed with castor oil and moxa punk. Because the base is a plant one that has been pulverised, the texture is very loose due to the fact that it does not bind. The appearance is sponge like and not oily.

Plant-based paste tends to dry more quickly than silk-based pastes because the plant extract does not hold onto the oil as tightly as silk. Depending on the paper used, plant pastes can dry in 10 to 15 minutes. The more absorbent the paper is, the faster it dries as the paper absorbs most of the oil. Also, plant pastes tend to smudge more easily than silk pastes due to the loose binding agent.

The paste is kept covered after it has been used, in its original container (be it plastic or ceramic). It is kept in an environment away from direct sunlight and away from intense heat to prevent it from drying out. The paste for silk based pastes need to be stirred with a spatula every month or so to avoid the oil sinking down and drying out the paste as well as to prepare it for use. A good paste would produce a clear impression in one go; if the impression is not clear requiring further impressions then it indicates that the paste is either too dry or the cinnabar has been depleted.

When the seal is pressed onto the printing surface, the procedure differs according to plant or silk based paste. For silk based paste, the user applies pressure, often with a specially made soft, flat surface beneath the paper. For plant based paste, the user simply applies light pressure. As lifting the seal vertically away from its imprint may rip or damage paper, the seal is usually lifted off one side at a time, as if bent off from the page. After this, the image may be blotted with a piece of paper to make it dry faster, although this may smudge it. Usually there needs to be a pile of soft felt or paper under the paper to be imprinted for a clear seal impression.

 Usage across East Asia 
 Chinese usage 

Many people in China possess a personal name seal. Artists, scholars, collectors and intellectuals may possess a full set of name seals, leisure seals, and studio seals. A well-made seal made from semi-precious stones can cost between 400 and 4000 yuan (about 60 to 600 United States dollars in 2021).

Seals are still used for official purposes in a number of contexts. When collecting parcels or registered post, the name seal serves as an identification, akin to a signature. In banks, traditionally the method of identification was also by a seal. Seals remain the customary form of identification on cheques in mainland China and Taiwan. Today, personal identification is often by a hand signature accompanied by a seal imprint. Seals can serve as identification with signatures because they are more difficult to forge than a signature, and only the owner has access to his own seal.

Seals are also often used on Chinese calligraphy works and Chinese paintings, usually imprinted in such works in the order (from top to bottom) of name seal, leisure seal(s), then studio seal. Owners or collectors of paintings or books will often add their own studio seals to pieces they have collected. This practice is an act of appreciation towards the work. Some artworks have had not only seals but inscriptions of the owner on them; for example, the Qianlong Emperor had as many as 20 different seals for use with inscriptions on paintings he collected. Provided that it is tastefully done (for example, not obscuring the body of the painting, appropriate inscription, fine calligraphy, etc.), this practice does not devalue the painting but could possibly enhance it by giving it further provenance, especially if it is a seal of a famous or celebrated individual who possessed the work at some point.

Seals are usually carved by specialist seal carvers, or by the users themselves. Specialist carvers carve the user's name into the stone in one of the standard scripts and styles described above, usually for a fee. Some people carve their own seals using soapstone and fine knives, which are widely available; this is cheaper than paying a professional for expertise, craft and material. Results vary, but individuals can carve perfectly legitimate seals for themselves.

As a novelty souvenir, seal carvers also ply tourist business at Chinatowns and tourist destinations in China. They often carve on-the-spot or translations of foreign names on inexpensive soapstone, sometimes featuring Roman characters. Though such seals can be functional, they are typically nothing more than curios and may be inappropriate for serious use, and could devalue or deface serious works of art.

Determining which side of the seal should face up may be done in a number of ways: if there is a carving on top, the front should face the user; if there is an inscription on the side, it should face to the left of the user; if there is a dot on the side, it should face away from the user.

Once seals are used, as much paste as possible is wiped from the printing surface and off the edges with a suitable material. The seals are kept in a constant environment, especially seals made of sandalwood or black ox horn. Tall thin seals are best kept on their sides, to prevent them from wobbling and falling down. More important seals, such as authority and society seals, are encased or wrapped in a golden silk cloth for protection.

 Hong Kong 
In Hong Kong, seals have fallen out of general use, as signatures are often required. In the past, seals were used by businesses on documents related to transactions. Seals have also been used in lieu of a signature for the city's illiterate population.

Lisa Lim of the South China Morning Post stated in 2016 that often Hong Kongers are asked to use the word "stamp" instead of chop in formal writing so non-Hong Kongers may understand.

 Japanese usage 

Inkan is the most comprehensive term; hanko tends to refer to seals used on less important documents.

The first evidence of writing in Japan is a hanko dating from AD 57, made of solid gold given to the ruler of Nakoku by Emperor Guangwu of Han, called King of Na gold seal. At first, only the Emperor and his most trusted vassals held hanko, as they were a symbol of the Emperor's authority. Noble people began using their own personal hanko after 750 AD, and samurai began using them at some time during the Feudal Period. Samurai were permitted exclusive use of red ink. Chinese style seals were also utilized by the Ryūkyū Kingdom. After modernization began in 1870, hanko came into general use throughout Japanese society.

Government offices and corporations usually have inkan specific to their bureau or company and follow the general rules outlined for jitsuin with the following exceptions. Their handles are often ornately carved with friezes of mythical beasts or hand-carved hakubun inscriptions that might be quotes from literature, names and dates, or original poetry. The Privy Seal of Japan is an example; weighing over 3.55 kg and measuring 9.09 cm it is used for official purposes by the Emperor.

Some seals have been carved with square tunnels from handle to underside, so that a person can slide their inkan into the hollow, thus signing a document with both their name and the business's (or bureau's) name. These seals are usually stored in jitsuin-style boxes under high security except at official ceremonies, at which they are displayed on ornate stands or in their boxes.

For personal use, there are at least four kinds of seals. In order from most to least formal/official, they are jitsuin, ginkō-in, mitome-in, and gagō-in.

 Jitsuin 
A  is an officially registered seal. A registered seal is needed to conduct business and other important or legally binding events. A jitsuin is used when purchasing a vehicle, marrying, or purchasing land, for example.

The size, shape, material, decoration, and lettering style of jitsuin are closely regulated by law. It must contain the individual's full family and given name, without abbreviation. The lettering must be red with a white background (shubun), with roughly equal width lines used throughout the name. The font must be one of several based on ancient historical lettering styles found in metal, woodcarving, and so on. Ancient forms of ideographs are commonplace. A red perimeter must entirely surround the name, and there should be no other decoration on the underside (working surface) of the seal. The top and sides (handle) of the seal may be decorated in any fashion from completely undecorated to historical animal motifs, dates, names, and inscriptions.

Throughout Japan, rules governing jitsuin design are very stringent and each design is unique, so the vast majority of people entrust the creation of their jitsuin to a professional, paying upward of US$20 and more often closer to US$100, and using it for decades. People desirous of opening a new chapter in their lives—say, following a divorce, death of a spouse, a long streak of bad luck, or a change in career—will often have a new jitsuin made.

The material is usually a high quality hard stone or, far less frequently, deerhorn, soapstone, or jade. It is sometimes carved by machine. When carved by hand, an intō ("seal-engraving blade"), a mirror, and a small specialized wooden vice are used. An intō is a flat-bladed pencil-sized chisel, usually round or octagonal in cross-section and sometimes wrapped in string to give a better grip. The intō is held vertically in one hand, with the point projecting from the carver's fist on the side opposite the thumb. New, modern intō range in price from less than US$1 to US$100.

The jitsuin are kept in secure places such as bank vaults. or hidden in a home. They are usually stored in thumb-sized rectangular boxes made of cardboard covered with embroidered green fabric outside and red silk or red velvet inside, held closed by a white plastic or deerhorn splinter tied to the lid and passed through a fabric loop attached to the lower half of the box. Because of the superficial resemblance to coffins, they are often called "coffins" in Japanese by enthusiasts and hanko boutiques. The paste is usually stored separately.

 Ginkō-in 

A  is used specifically for banking; ginkō means "bank". A person's savings account passbook contains an original impression of the ginkō-in alongside a bank employee's seal. Rules for the size and design vary somewhat from bank to bank; generally, they contain a Japanese person's full name. A Westerner may be permitted to use a full family name with or without an abbreviated given name, such as "Smith", "Bill Smith", "W Smith" or "Wm Smith" in place of "William Smith". The lettering can be red or white, in any font, and with artistic decoration.

Since mass-produced ginkō-in offer no security, people either have them custom-made by professionals or make their own by hand. They were traditionally made of wood or stone; more recently of ivory, and carried in a variety of thumb-shape and -size cases resembling cloth purses or plastic pencil cases. They are usually hidden carefully in the owner's home.

Banks always provide stamp pads or ink paste, and dry cleaning tissues. The banks also provide small plastic scrubbing surfaces similar to small patches of red artificial grass. These are attached to counters and used to scrub the accumulated ink paste from the working surface of customers' seals.

 Mitome-in 

A  is a moderately formal seal typically used for signing for postal deliveries, signing utility bill payments, signing internal company memos, confirming receipt of internal company mail, and other low-security everyday functions.Mitome-in are commonly stored in low-security, high-utility places such as office desk drawers and in the anteroom (genkan) of a residence.

A mitome-ins form is governed by fewer customs than jitsuin and ginkō-in. However, mitome-in adhere to a handful of strongly observed customs. The size is the attribute most strongly governed by social custom. A man's is usually slightly larger than a woman's, and a junior employee's is always smaller than his bosses' and his senior co-workers', in keeping with office social hierarchy. The mitome-in always has the person's family name and usually does not have the person's given name (shita no namae). Mitome-ins are often round or oval, but square ones are not uncommon, and rectangular ones are not unheard-of; irregular shapes are not used. They can produce red lettering on a blank field (shubun) or the opposite (hakubun). Borderlines around their edges are optional.

Plastic mitome-in in popular Japanese names can be obtained from stationery stores for less than US$1, though ones made from inexpensive stone are also very popular. Inexpensive prefabricated seals are called . Rubber stamps are unacceptable for business purposes.

Mitome-in and lesser seals are usually stored in inexpensive plastic cases, sometimes with small supplies of red paste or a stamp pad included.

Most Japanese also have a less formal seal used to sign personal letters or initial changes in documents; this is referred to by the broadly generic term hanko. They often display only a single hiragana, kanji ideograph, or katakana character carved in it. They are as often round or oval as they are square.

Gagō-in 

 are used by graphic artists to both decorate and sign their work. The practice goes back several hundred years. The signatures are frequently pen names or nicknames; the decorations are usually favorite slogans or other extremely short phrases. A gago in can be any size, design, or shape. Irregular naturally occurring outlines and handles, as though a river stone were cut in two, are commonplace. The material may be anything, though in modern times soft stone is the most common and metal is rare.

Their carving is a form of calligraphic art. Foreign names may be carved in rōmaji, katakana, hiragana, or kanji. Inkan for standard Japanese names may be purchased prefabricated.

Almost every stationery store, discount store, large book store, and department store carries small do-it-yourself kits for making hanko. These include instructions, hiragana fonts written forward and in mirror-writing (as required on the working surface of a seal), a slim in tou chisel, two or three grades of sandpaper, slim marker pen (to draw the design on the stone), and one to three mottled, inexpensive, soft square green finger-size stones.

In modern Japan, most people have several inkan.

A certificate of authenticity is required for any hanko used in a significant business transaction. Registration and certification of an inkan may be obtained in a local municipal office (e.g., city hall).

The increasing ease with which modern technology allows hanko fraud is beginning to cause some concern that the present system will not be able to survive.

Signatures are not used for most transactions, but in some cases, such as signing a cell phone contract, they may be used, sometimes in addition to a stamp from a mitome-in. For these transactions, a jitsuin is too official, while a mitome-in alone is insufficient, and thus signatures are used.

Discouragement 
During 2020, the Japanese government has been attempting to discourage the use of seals, because the practice requires generation of paper documents that interfere with electronic record-keeping and slow digital communications. The delay has been most pressing in infectious disease reporting during the COVID-19 pandemic: officials found it took up to three days between a case of COVID-19 being discovered and it being reported to the public. Japanese prime minister Yoshihide Suga has set the digitalization of the bureaucracy and ultimately of Japan's entire society as a key priority. He aims to establish a new digital agency to put the idea into practice. Ministries were urged to end hanko requirements for 785 types of procedure, 96% of the total, including tax documents. Most business people favoured discontinuing hanko, but half considered that it would be difficult to do so. Politicians also opposed discontinuing their regional hand-carved hanko—a "symbol of Japan".

Korean usage 

The seal was first introduced to Korea in approximately 2nd century BC. The remaining oldest record of its usage in Korea is that kings of Buyeo used a royal seal (oksae: 옥새, 玉璽) which bore the inscription of Seal of the King of Ye (濊王之印, 예왕지인). The use of seals became popular during the Three Kingdoms of Korea period.

In the case of State Seals in monarchic Korea, there were two types in use: Gugin (국인, 國印) which was conferred by the Emperor of China to Korean kings, with the intent of keeping relations between two countries as brothers (Sadae). This was used only in communications with China and for the coronation of kings. Others, generally called eobo (어보, 御寶) or eosae (어새, 御璽), are used in foreign communications with countries other than China, and for domestic uses. Seals were also used by government officials in documents. These types of seals were called gwanin (관인, 官印) and it was supervised by specialist officials. With the declaration of establishment of Republic of Korea in 1948, its government created a new State Seal, guksae (국새, 國璽) and it is used in promulgation of constitution, designation of cabinet members and ambassadors, conference of national orders and important diplomatic documents.

Seals are still commonly used in South Korea. Most Koreans have personal seals, and every government agency and commercial corporation has its own seals to use in public documents. While signing is also accepted, many Koreans think it is more formal to use seals in public documents. In 2008, the Constitutional Court of South Korea upheld a Supreme court judgement that a signed handwritten will without a registered seal was invalid. Korean seals are made of wood, jade, or sometimes ivory for more value. State Seals were generally made of gold or high-quality jade. There are rare cases of bronze or steel seals.

Mongolian usage 
While Chinese-style seals are typically used in China, Japan, and Korea, they are occasionally used outside East Asia. For example, the rulers of the Ilkhanate, a Mongol khanate established by Hulagu Khan in Persia, used seals containing Chinese characters in their diplomatic letters, such as the letter from Arghun to French King Philip IV and the letter from Ghazan to Pope Boniface VIII. These seals were sent by the emperors of the Yuan dynasty, a Mongol-ruled dynasty of China, especially by Kublai Khan and his successor Emperor Chengzong.

Personal seals 
Personal seals in Korea can be classified by their legal status. Ingam (인감, 印鑑) or sirin (실인, 實印), meaning registered seal, is a seal which has been registered by a local office, attested by a "certificate of seal registration", a document required for most significant business transactions and civil services.

The legal system of registered seals was introduced by the Japanese colonial government in 1914. While it was scheduled to be completely replaced by an electronic certification system in 2013 in order to counter fraud,  ingam still remains an official means of verification for binding legal agreement and identification. The government passed the 'Act on Confirmation, etc. of Personal Signature (본인서명사실 확인 등에 관한 법률)' in 2012, which gives registered handwritten signatures the same legal effect as ingam.

While ingam is used on important business, other dojangs are used for everyday purposes, such as less-significant official transactions. Thus most Koreans have more than two seals.

In traditional arts, as in China and Japan, an artist of Chinese calligraphy and paintings would use seals (generally leisure seals and studio seals) to identify their work. These types of seals were called Nakkwan (낙관, 落款). As seal-carving was also considered a form of art, many artists carved their own seals. Seals of Joseon-period calligraphist and natural historian Kim Jung-hee (aka Wandang or Chusa) are considered to be antiques.

Usage in Southeast Asia

Singaporean usage 
The seal has been present in all Singapore dollar banknotes since its first series, bearing the chairman of the Monetary Authority of Singapore (MAS) or the Board of Commissioners of Currency Singapore (BCCS).

Vietnamese usage 

The seal is used to a lesser extent in Vietnam by authorised organisations and businesses, and also traditional Vietnamese artists. It was more common in Vietnam prior to French rule, when signatures became the usual practice, although usually seen as having less authority in a corporate environment.

See also 
 The Eight Masters of Xiling and Xiling Society of the Seal Art
 Cash seal
 Heirloom Seal of the Realm
 Knob carving
 Side carving
 Seal script

Notes

References

Citations

Sources 

 Kong Yunbai 孔雲白, Zhuanke Rumen 篆刻入門. Shanghai Book Publishings 上海書店印行: Shanghai, 1936.
 Qu Leilei, Chinese Calligraphy. Cico Books Ltd.: London, 2002.
 Wang Jia-nan; Cai Xiaoli and Young, Dawn; The Complete Oriental Painting Course: A structured, practical guide to painting skills and techniques of China and the Far East. Quarto Publishing plc. and Aurum Press: London, 1997.
 Wren, Christopher S. Chinese Chops: A Signature in Stone. New York Times. 10 February 1985.
 Masterpieces of Japanese Prints: Ukiyo-e from the Victoria and Albert Museum by Rupert Faulkner, Basil William Robinson, Richard Lane, Victoria and Albert Museum

External links 
 Chinese Seals at China Online Museum
 The Art of Chinese Chop (Seal Carving)
 History of Chinese Seal Carvings
 Art-Virtue.com History of Chinese seal making
 A chop is necessary for approving decisions relating to the operations and management of a company in China.
 Introduction to Chinese Seal Carving
 Seal culture still remains in electronic commerce
 HANKO (Daniel Semo, 20 July 2021) - 99% Invisible, Episode #451

Seals (insignia)
Authentication methods
Chinese heraldry
Chinese inventions
Chinese seal art
East Asian art
East Asian traditions
Identity documents
Japanese heraldry
Korean heraldry
Vietnamese heraldry